Elder Creek is a major stream in Tehama County, California and a tributary of the Sacramento River. Like the other streams draining this part of the western Sacramento Valley, Elder Creek is a highly seasonal stream that flows only during the winter and spring.

Elder Creek was so named for the elder trees lining its course. A variant name was Arroyo de los Saucos.

See also
List of rivers of California

References

Rivers of Tehama County, California